McLaren is a 69-metre, 21 storey tall office building in Birmingham, England. Designed by Paul Bonham Associates and built in 1972, it is a thin brown office building and currently the 16th tallest occupied building in Birmingham.

Originally it housed part of the staff training department of Midland Bank, now HSBC. The building is owned by property company Bruntwood who purchased it from the Birmingham Alliance in 2008.

It is situated on the edge of two redevelopment sites to the south and east. Masshouse to the east and Martineau Galleries to the south are due to be redeveloped at some time in the future. The entrance is on Priory Queensway, and near the junction with Moor Street Queensway. During 2009 the building was renovated with its exterior glazing given a fresh look. As at December 2012 the building was 65% occupied.

Tenants
Managed Enterprise Technologies Ltd/METCloud
Cartwright King - corporate and criminal defence solicitors
Central and West Birmingham Victim Support 
Driving Standards Agency - the Birmingham Theory Test Centre 
Sigma Financial Group Ltd
UNISON - public sector trade union
Select Energy Group Ltd
Estio Training

References

External links

Bruntwood: McLaren Building
Emporis entry
Skyscrapernews entry
RIBApix image 1978

Buildings and structures in Birmingham, West Midlands
Unison (trade union)
Modernist architecture in England